Fayaz Tepe, also Fayoz-Tepe, is a Buddhist archaeological site in the Central Asia region of Bactria, in the Termez oasis near the city of Termez in southern Uzbekistan. Located 15 km west of Termez off the main M39 highway. Bus number 15 runs past the turn-off to Fayaz Tepe, from where it is a 1 km walk without shade.
The foundations of the site date to the 1st century CE, with a peak of activity around the 3rd and 4th centuries during the Kushan period, before experiencing a fatal decline around the 5th century CE, probably with the invasion of the Kushano-Sassanian, whose coinage can be found at the nearby site of Kara Tepe.

Site
The site of Fayaz Tepe is located a few hundred meters from Kara Tepe, not far from the city of Termez.

Artefacts
From the site were recovered numerous Buddhist frescoes and reliefs, now mostly located in the State Museum of History of Uzbekistan in Tashkent. A famous niche showing the Buddha and two monks is dated to the 3rd-4th century CE. An inscription has been found recently, which mentions the Kushan king Huvishka.

See also
 Kara Tepe
 Dalverzin Tepe
 Khalchayan
 Surkh Kotal

References

Archaeological sites in Uzbekistan
Kushan Empire
Sites along the Silk Road